James Fitzjames (27 July 1813 –  disappeared 26 April 1848) was a British Royal Navy officer who participated in two major exploratory expeditions, the Euphrates Expedition and the Franklin Expedition.

Early life 
He was of illegitimate birth, and during his life and after, his friends and relatives took great pains to conceal his origins. 
The names given by the people who posed as his parents, "James Fitzjames" and "Ann Fitzjames," are presumed to be false.

Illegitimate birth 
The identification of his true family has been a mystery. In different sources it has been suggested that he was a foundling; that he was of Irish extraction, an illegitimate son of Sir James Stephen, or a relative of the Coninghams. But he was actually the illegitimate son of Sir James Gambier, a minor diplomat. Although not always successful, the Gambier family were prominent in the Royal Naval service. Sir James's cousin was a controversial sea lord Admiral Lord Gambier. His father, and James Fitzjames' grandfather, was Vice Admiral James Gambier. The identity of his mother remains unknown.

At the time of Fitzjames' birth, Sir James Gambier was in grave personal and financial difficulties. Sir James had been appointed British Consul-General in Rio de Janeiro in 1809 and held this office until 1814, although a diplomatic faux pas on his part meant that he had to leave Rio for England in disgrace in 1811. Cut off from the revenues he expected to receive in Rio, he ran up enormous debts, only saved from bankruptcy when a syndicate of his relatives and creditors, led by Admiral Lord Gambier himself, William Morton Pitt and Samuel Gambier, took over his financial affairs and placed them in trust.

Sir James had married Jemima Snell and the couple had 15 children altogether. One of their children was born within one month of the date of Fitzjames' birth and at the time the Gambiers may have been estranged. In 1815, with his financial affairs in the hands of trustees, Sir James resumed a diplomatic career by being appointed Consul-General to the Netherlands at The Hague, a position he held until 1825. He appears to have had limited contact with Fitzjames.

Adoptive family 
Shortly after his birth, Fitzjames was given into the care of the Reverend Robert Coningham and his wife Louisa Capper, who wrote philosophical and poetical works. The Coninghams were well-off members of an extended family of Scots/Irish ancestry who, with others from a similar background, settled in the Watford area of Hertfordshire.

The Coningham family seem to have lived at several locations in Hertfordshire, settling in the late 1820s at a substantial 30 acre country estate called Rose Hill in Abbots Langley. Robert and Louisa had one son, William Coningham, who was James Fitzjames' closest friend; the two boys were brought up together as brothers. The Coninghams were a well-educated couple who had extensive connections in British intellectual circles of the time. Robert Coningham was a Cambridge-educated clergyman although he never took a living. He was a cousin of the author John Sterling, and a friend of such intellectuals as Julius Hare and Thomas Carlyle. Before she married, Louisa Coningham had taught at the Rothsay House girls' school in Kennington and was the author of two books.

This intellectual background enabled them to provide Fitzjames and William Coningham with an exceptionally high level of education. On Fitzjames' return to the Coningham household, William Coningham was withdrawn from Eton and the boys' education was provided at home by private tutors, including a son of Robert Towerson Cory, who later tutored the Prince of Wales for Queen Victoria and Prince Albert. Fitzjames was brought up by the Coningham family as a son, and although he was unrelated to them he always referred to them as 'uncle' and 'aunt'.

Naval career

Under Captain Gambier 
Captain Robert Gambier was actually James Fitzjames' second cousin, and it was through this covert family connection that he was able to obtain this position, notwithstanding his illegitimacy and the Coningham family's lack of Royal Naval connections. Unfortunately, Captain Gambier resigned his position only a year later due to the unexpected death of his wife, leaving Fitzjames vulnerable as he had no connection with the new captain, George Sartorius.

However, Fitzjames was able to win the confidence of Captain Sartorius, who promoted Fitzjames to Volunteer of the First Class in 1828. During this commission Pyramus first sailed to Central America and the United States on diplomatic missions and was then involved in scientific research as part of the Experimental Squadron under Admiral Sir Thomas Hardy. Later, he served as British guardship at Lisbon.

Although after this the Coninghams and the Gambiers wanted to send him to Cambridge, Fitzjames was determined to resume his Royal Naval career. But with Robert Gambier effectively retired on half-pay and George Sartorius now serving irregularly in the Portuguese Navy, James Fitzjames had great difficulty obtaining a position as a midshipman. St Vincent was the flagship of the Royal Navy's Mediterranean Fleet but spent much time in port at Malta.

During this time Fitzjames passed his exams for promotion to lieutenant, but only with great difficulty was this achieved owing to the highly irregular way he had obtained his position as midshipman and, of course his illegitimate birth which was still unrecognisable at law. In this position he would expect to obtain his promotion to lieutenant.

Euphrates Expedition 
Robert Coningham had become extremely close to a relative of his, Major Colin Campbell, who after Fitzjames' death became famous as Field Marshal Lord Clyde. Campbell introduced Fitzjames to Francis Rawdon Chesney, then a captain of the engineers, who was putting together an expedition to establish a steamship line in Mesopotamia.

The venture became known as the Euphrates Expedition, and served as a precursor to the creation of the Suez Canal as it linked the Near East across Mesopotamia to the river systems that flowed into the Persian Gulf.

Fitzjames served on the Euphrates Expedition from 1834 to 1837. Before the expedition had even sailed, he distinguished himself by diving into the River Mersey fully clothed to rescue a drowning man. He was awarded a silver cup and the Freedom of the City of Liverpool for this feat of bravery.

Although the expedition was promoted with great energy, it was not a success. The smaller steamer, Tigris, sank with heavy loss of life in a sudden storm and the draught of Euphrates, the surviving vessel was too deep to sail on the river for much of the year. In addition there were tremendous difficulties caused both by political complications and the outbreak of disease.

While Chesney was determined to continue, he would not release officers, including Fitzjames, the expedition was eventually halted by the British government and East India Company, its two major sponsors. In 1836, with the steamer Euphrates unable to sail up the shallows of the river, having broken its engine.

Resumption of naval career 
After many extremely dangerous adventures (he was nearly kidnapped and trapped in a besieged town) Fitzjames succeeded in returning to London. Here he was reunited with the surviving members of the expedition as they straggled back home. Sadly while he had been away, Robert Coningham had died suddenly and the remaining members of the Coningham family, all apparently in poor health, had sold their substantial house, Rose Hill, near Abbot's Langley, and were living at Watford.

On the expedition, Fitzjames formed lifelong friendships with two of the other Royal Navy officers participating, lieutenants Richard Cleaveland and Edward Charlewood. Cleaveland, Charlewood and Fitzjames found that contrary to the understanding of Colonel Chesney, the Admiralty refused to credit their service on the Euphrates Expedition as 'sea-time', and it therefore would not count towards their promotion. Chesney did everything in his power to support his subordinates, and after nearly a year the Admiralty relented and granted the three officers their promotions.

James Fitzjames resumed Royal Naval service and followed a much more conventional career path. At this time he also formed a close, albeit also professionally extremely useful, friendship with John Barrow, the son of Sir John Barrow, a highly influential Second Secretary to the Admiralty. From this point on the two men corresponded regularly.

Egyptian–Ottoman War 
He was regarded as an effective officer and was especially commended by Admiral Sir Charles Napier for landing at night to distribute a proclamation to Egyptian soldiers at their camp. It was very risky enterprise, but he was able to escape back to Ganges.

When informed of this daring exploit Ibrahim Pasha, the Egyptian general, put a price on Fitzjames' head.

First Opium War 
His service in this war was again marked by notably reckless bravery, he was almost killed during the capture of Zhenjiang; he was evacuated to Cornwallis when a musket ball passed through his arm into his back, lodging against his spine. Senior officers took further notice of an extrovert; Fitzjames wrote and published a 10,000-word humorous poem, The Cruise of HMS Cornwallis, describing the First Opium War and his part in that particular uprising, which was published in The Nautical Magazine. Ostensibly anonymous, he referred to himself under the byline "Tom Bowline".

En route to war, HMS Cornwallis spent five days at Singapore. While there on shore leave, Fitzjames had some sort of encounter with Sir George Barrow, the eldest surviving son of Sir John Barrow. It is not clear what happened, but Barrow was clearly in a highly compromised situation; for his part Fitzjames appeared to have paid someone off and thereby covered up whatever scandal would otherwise have broken over the Barrow family. Thenceforward Sir John Barrow blatantly favoured Fitzjames, promoting his candidacy at any available opportunity; the first fruits were accelerated promotion to commander and appointment to command . Joining the Clio in Bombay, the new captain cruised the Persian Gulf and carried out various duties before returning to Portsmouth in October 1844.

Franklin's Expedition 
Returning to England, Fitzjames lived with William Coningham, his wife Elizabeth (née Meyrick) and their two young children at their home in Brighton. This was just the time that the Franklin Expedition was being planned and Sir John Barrow, a prime mover of the expedition, campaigned to have Fitzjames appointed to lead it. He asked for his friend Edward Charlewood to be appointed as second in command. Barrow was unable to provide the Board of the Admiralty with a persuasive argument to support these appointments, so after some prevarication Sir John Franklin and Francis Crozier were appointed instead.

Once appointed to the Franklin Expedition, Fitzjames was given specific responsibility for recruitment and also for the scientific research into magnetism which was an important objective of the expedition. The ships sailed from Greenhithe in May, 1845 and after replenishing at Disko Bay in Greenland were last seen at the end of July 1845 by two whalers in northern Baffin Bay. That was the last definite sighting of Fitzjames. The Admiralty promoted him to the rank of Captain on 31 December 1845, but this news never reached him.

Captaincy and death 
This is the last definite trace of Fitzjames, although he may be one of the shadowy kabloonas—desperate survivors of the expedition, whom Inuit of the region remembered meeting.

Character 

Fitzjames struggled to find his position in early nineteenth-century British society. While illegitimacy was not unusual, it caused great difficulties for the children concerned, who were not expected openly to refer to their blood families and could not depend on any support from them. In Fitzjames' case the controversial reputations of his Royal Naval ancestors, and the disreputable behaviour of his father, compounded this. In addition, the underhand way he obtained his promotion to midshipman made his position in the Royal Navy extremely vulnerable leaving his career up until 1838 open to challenge.

While his family position was always vulnerable, he did have several advantages. He was physically fit and strong, being tall and well-built. He was handsome, extremely personable, and very skilled in winning the confidence of his superiors, he possessed charm and charisma. Added to this he was highly intelligent and had been very well educated; an excellent sense of humour rounded off a personality that was the life and soul of any party or other situation. To judge by his surviving letters and drawings, he was a sensitive writer and an excellent artist.

But he was always very conscious of the insecurity of his social position and this may explain the extreme personal and professional recklessness which he displayed throughout his life. Whether jumping into the River Mersey to rescue the drowning man, entering the Egyptian soldiers' camp or leading the assault on the walls of Zhenjiang, the impression left was that he was potentially willing to risk or even honorably sacrifice his life if the opportunity arose in order to demonstrate that he was as good as, or better, than his legitimate contemporaries.

Legacy 

After the disappearance of the Franklin Expedition, Fitzjames' loss was recorded on various monuments to it, such as one statue at Waterloo Place in London. According to at least one source, he was idolised somewhat by Sir Clements Markham and Sir Albert Hastings Markham as an idealistic Arctic explorer. Furthermore, he may have inadvertently acted as a model for Captain Robert Falcon Scott.

The only overt tribute to Fitzjames was in a family record 'The Story of the Gambiers', written in 1924 for private circulation by Mrs. Cuthbert Heath, a descendant of Sir James Gambier and published in 1924, in which Mrs. Heath wrote:

In popular culture 
James Fitzjames appears as a character in the 2007 novel, The Terror by Dan Simmons, a fictionalized account of Franklin's lost expedition, as well as the 2018 television adaptation, where he is portrayed by Tobias Menzies.

See also
List of people who disappeared mysteriously at sea

References

Online 
jamesfitzjames.com - Website by historian Fabiënne Tetteroo containing new research, primary sources and much more.

Bibliography 
 
 
 
 
 
 

19th-century deaths
1813 births
1840s missing person cases
English people of French descent
English people of Irish descent
English people of Portuguese descent
English polar explorers
Explorers of Canada
Explorers of the Arctic
Franklin's lost expedition
Lost explorers
Recipients of the Polar Medal
Royal Navy officers
Royal Navy personnel of the Egyptian–Ottoman War (1839–1841)
Royal Navy personnel of the First Opium War